Pallidoplectron is a genus of cave wētā in the family Rhaphidophoridae, endemic to New Zealand.

Species 
 Pallidoplectron peniculosum Richards, 1960 
 Pallidoplectron subterraneum Richards, 1965 
 Pallidoplectron turneri Richards, 1958b

References 

 Peripatus

Ensifera genera
Cave weta
Endemic fauna of New Zealand
Endemic insects of New Zealand